Roud is the Roud Folk Song Index, a database collected from oral tradition in the English language.

Roud may also refer to:

Places

 Roud, Isle of Wight, a hamlet in England

People
 Gustave Roud (1897–1976), Swiss poet and photographer
 Richard Roud (1929–1989), American writer on film
 Steve Roud, creator of the Roud Folk Song Index